Fiddle Faddle is candy-coated popcorn produced by ConAgra Foods. Introduced in 1967, the snack is commonly found in US discount and drug stores. Fiddle Faddle consists of popped popcorn covered with either caramel or butter toffee and mixed with peanuts.

See also

Cracker Jack
Screaming Yellow Zonkers
Poppycock
Crunch 'n Munch
List of popcorn brands
Lolly Gobble Bliss Bombs
Lincoln Snacks Company

References

Brand name snack foods
Popcorn brands
Brand name confectionery
Products introduced in 1967
Conagra Brands brands